Hotel Adlon is a 1955 West German drama film filmed in German and directed by Josef von Báky, starring Sebastian Fischer, Nelly Borgeaud and René Deltgen.

It was shot at the Spandau Studios with film's sets designed by the art director Rolf Zehetbauer.

Portrayal
The film portrays life at the luxurious Berlin Hotel Adlon from 1907 to 1945. It was inspired by the 1955 autobiography, Hotel Adlon. Das Berliner Hotel, in dem die große Welt zu Gast war, published in English in 1960 as Hotel Adlon: The Life and Death of a Great Hotel by Hedda Adlon (1889–1967) (née Hedwig Leythen), daughter-in-law of Lorenz Adlon and  Louis Adlon's father's second wife.

Other Portrayals
Film director Percy Adlon, great-grandson of Lorenz Adlon made a documentary about the hotel called The Glamorous World of the Adlon Hotel in 1996. A three-part drama mini-series set at the hotel entitled  was broadcast on the German television station ZDF in January 2013 and a documentary Das Adlon – Die Dokumentation (The Adlon: A Documentary) was also broadcast by ZDF in January 2013.

Cast
 Sebastian Fischer as Paul Rippert
 Nelly Borgeaud as Ninette
 René Deltgen as Gravic
 Werner Hinz as Lorenz Adlon
 Nadja Tiller as Mabel
 Erich Schellow as Louis Adlon
 Karl John as Herr von Malbrand
 Peter Mosbacher as Herr Andrewski
 Lola Müthel as Nina
 Hans Caninenberg as Direktor Jansen
 Walter Bluhm as Solicitor
 Arno Paulsen as Doorman
 Kurt Buecheler
 Stanislav Ledinek
 Helmuth Lohner
 Ralph Lothar
 Werner Peters
 Ewald Wenck
 Claude Farell
 Lori Leux
 Harry Giese

See also
 Lorenz Adlon (1849–1921), German hotelier
 Hotel Adlon, Berlin, Germany – built by Lorenz Adlon
 Louis Adlon (1908–1947), German-American film actor in Hollywood, grandson of Lorenz
 Percy Adlon (born 1935, Munich), German film producer, cousin of Louis
 Pamela Adlon (born 1966), American actress, daughter-in-law of Percy

References

Bibliography 
 Frodon, Jean-Michel. Cinema and the Shoah. SUNY Press, 2010.

External links 
 

1955 films
West German films
1950s historical drama films
German historical drama films
1950s German-language films
Films directed by Josef von Báky
Films set in Berlin
Films set in the 1900s
Films set in the 1910s
Films set in the 1920s
Films set in the 1930s
Films set in the 1940s
Films set in hotels
1955 drama films
Films shot at Spandau Studios
German black-and-white films
1950s German films